Giant is a 2006 studio album by Herman Düne.

Track listing
 "I Wish That I Could See You Soon" – 2:49
 "Nickel Chrome" – 4:05
 "1-2-3/Apple Tree" – 3:24
 "Bristol" – 3:08
 "Pure Hearts" – 4:03
 "No Master" 2:54
 "Take Him Back to New York City" – 6:04
 "Baby Bigger" – 1:32
 "This Summer" – 4:20
 "Your Name/My Game" – 3:59
 "By the Light of the Moon" – 2:26
 "When the Water Gets Cold & Freezes on the Lake" – 3:58
 "Giant" – 4:25
 "I'd Rather Walk Than Run" – 2:24
 "Glory of Old" – 4:07
 "Mrs Bigger" – 1:35

Personnel 
Songwriting, Singing, Guitar: David-Ivar Herman Düne (aka Ya Ya) & Andre Herman Düne
Drums And Percussion: Néman Herman Düne
Bongo-Drums, Percussion: Doctor Lori Schonberg
Back-Up Female Singing: The Woo-Woos > Featuring Lisa Li-Lund, Angela Carlucci and Crystal Madrilejos (The Babyskins)
Horns And Brass: The Jon Natchez Bourbon Horns featuring Kelly Pratt
Bass, Ukulele, Marimba: David-Ivar Herman Düne
Solo Alto Saxophone: Andre Herman Düne

External links 
 Official website for Herman Düne

2006 albums
Herman Dune albums